Seán Mac Giollarnáth (1880-29 January 1970) was an Irish folklorist.

A native of Coill an Bhogaigh, Gurteen, Ballinasloe, Mac Giollarnáth lived for a time in London before moving to Dublin where he taught at St. Enda's, Rathfarnham. From 1909 to 1916 he was editor of An Claidheamh Soluis. He acted as a courier for the Old I.R.A. during the Irish War of Independence. In 1923 he was appointed District Justice, which he held till he retired in 1950.

He held a lifelong interest in wildlife and folklore, which formed the basis for much of his published work. He was awarded an LL.D by the National University of Ireland in the 1960s.

Select bibliography

 Fi-Fa-Fum. In bhfuil Seanann agus an giosadan ponaire [and other tales], Baile Atha Cliath, 1931
 Loinnir Mac Leabhair agus scealta gairid eile, 1936
 Feilre na n-ean, Oifig an tSolathair, 1940
 Cudar agus scealta eile, Baile Atha Claith, 1949

References

 Galway Authors, Helen Mahar, 1976

People from County Galway
20th-century Irish people
1880 births
1970 deaths
Irish folklorists
Irish-language writers